The 2014 Sony Open Tennis (also known as 2014 Miami Masters) was a professional men and women's tennis tournament played on outdoor hard courts. It was the 30th edition of the Miami Masters, and was part of the Masters 1000 category on the 2014 ATP World Tour, and of the Premier Mandatory category on the 2014 WTA Tour. All men and women's events took place at the Tennis Center at Crandon Park in Key Biscayne, Florida, United States, from March 17 through March 30, 2014.

Points and prize money

Point distribution

 Players with byes receive first round points.

Prize money
The total commitment prize money for this year's event was $5,649,405 for men and $5,427,105 for women (WTA Tour and ATP World Tour).

Players

Men's singles

Seeds
The following are the seeded players. Rankings and seedings are according to ATP rankings on March 17, 2014.

Withdrawn players

Other entrants
The following players received wildcards into the singles main draw:
 Marcos Baghdatis
 Kyle Edmund
 Ryan Harrison
 Karen Khachanov
 Guido Pella

The following players received entry from the qualifying draw:
 Aljaž Bedene
 Alex Bogomolov Jr. 
 Thiemo de Bakker
 David Goffin
 Andrey Golubev
 Malek Jaziri 
 Steve Johnson
 Lukáš Lacko 
 Paul-Henri Mathieu 
 Jack Sock 
 Dominic Thiem 
 Jimmy Wang

The following players received entry as lucky losers:
 Benjamin Becker
 Dušan Lajović

Withdrawals
Before the tournament
 Pablo Andújar → replaced by  Stéphane Robert
 Brian Baker → replaced by  Bradley Klahn
 Juan Martín del Potro (wrist injury) → replaced by  Benjamin Becker
 Tommy Haas (shoulder injury) → replaced by  Dušan Lajović
 Jürgen Melzer (shoulder injury) → replaced by  Jiří Veselý
 Benoît Paire (knee injury) → replaced by  Sergiy Stakhovsky
 Dudi Sela → replaced by  Kenny de Schepper
 Janko Tipsarević (foot injury) → replaced by  Ivo Karlović
 Mikhail Youzhny (back injury) → replaced by  Daniel Gimeno Traver
During the tournament
 Tomáš Berdych (gastroenteritis)
 Florian Mayer
 Kei Nishikori (groin injury)

Retirements
 Mikhail Kukushkin

Men's doubles

Seeds

1 Rankings as of March 17, 2014.

Other entrants
The following pairs received wildcards into the doubles main draw:
  Deiton Baughman /  Martin Redlicki
  Ryan Harrison /  Jack Sock

Women's singles

Seeds
The following are the seeded players. Rankings and seedings are according to WTA rankings on March 3, 2014. Points before is as of March 17, 2014.

Withdrawn players

Other entrants
The following players received wildcards into the singles main draw:
 Casey Dellacqua
 Indy de Vroome
 Victoria Duval
 Anett Kontaveit
 Rebecca Peterson
 Nadia Petrova
 Heather Watson
 Aleksandra Wozniak

The following players received entry using a protected ranking into the singles main draw:
 Alisa Kleybanova
 Iveta Melzer
 Romina Oprandi

The following players received entry from the qualifying draw:
 Kiki Bertens 
 Estrella Cabeza Candela 
 Kimiko Date-Krumm
 Zarina Diyas
 Olga Govortsova
 Nadiia Kichenok
 Patricia Mayr-Achleitner 
 Shahar Pe'er 
 Katarzyna Piter 
 Virginie Razzano
 CoCo Vandeweghe 
 Donna Vekić

The following player received entry as a lucky loser:
 Jana Čepelová

Withdrawals
Before the tournament
 Victoria Azarenka (foot injury) → replaced by  Chanelle Scheepers
 Simona Halep (toe injury) → replaced by  Jana Čepelová
 Jamie Hampton → replaced by  Yanina Wickmayer
 Polona Hercog → replaced by  Caroline Garcia
 Maria Kirilenko → replaced by  Anna Karolína Schmiedlová
 Ayumi Morita → replaced by  Sílvia Soler Espinosa
 Laura Robson (wrist injury) → replaced by  Yaroslava Shvedova

During the tournament
 Alisa Kleybanova (illness)
 Sabine Lisicki (flu)

Retirements
 Mona Barthel (gastrointestinal illness)

Women's doubles

Seeds

1 Rankings as of March 3, 2014.

Other entrants
The following pairs received wildcards into the doubles main draw:
  Sorana Cîrstea /  Anastasia Pavlyuchenkova
  Kirsten Flipkens /  Ana Ivanovic
  Martina Hingis /  Sabine Lisicki
  Garbiñe Muguruza /  Carla Suárez Navarro
The following pair received entry as alternates:
  Sharon Fichman /  Megan Moulton-Levy

Withdrawals
Before the tournament
  Bethanie Mattek-Sands (left hip injury)
During the tournament
  Alisa Kleybanova (illness)

Finals

Men's singles

  Novak Djokovic defeated  Rafael Nadal, 6–3, 6–3

Women's singles

  Serena Williams defeated  Li Na, 7–5, 6–1

Men's doubles

  Bob Bryan /  Mike Bryan defeated  Juan Sebastián Cabal /  Robert Farah, 7–6(10–8), 6–4

Women's doubles

  Martina Hingis /  Sabine Lisicki defeated  Ekaterina Makarova /  Elena Vesnina,  4–6, 6–4, [10–5]

References

External links
Official website
Sony Open Tennis Schedule 

 
Miami Open (tennis)
Sony Open Tennis
Sony Open Tennis
Sony Open Tennis
Sony Open Tennis